Adana Airport or Adana Şakirpaşa Airport  is an international airport located in Adana, Turkey. The airport serves mainly to Cilicia region and in a lesser extent to the provinces surrounding Cilicia, due to its frequent domestic flight schedule and several flights to international destinations. With 5.1 million passengers in 2019, it is the sixth-busiest airport in Turkey. Opened in 1937, Şakirpaşa Airport is the oldest airport in Turkey that is still in public service.

History
Adana Airport was constructed on farmland at the Şakirpaşa area, 2.3 km west of the historical city centre. It was opened to service as a civil-military airport in 1937 and became a full civil airport in 1956.

Passenger traffic at Adana Airport is doubled since 2011, hitting a record in 2018 with 5,630,674  passengers. Due to economical downturn in Turkey, total number of passenger dropped for the first time in 10 years in 2019 with 10 percent. There are 436 weekly departures to 23 routes from the airport, connecting the region to 8 destinations in Turkey, 11 in Germany, 3 in the Middle East and one in N.Cyprus. Ercan is the shortest (40 min.), Hamburg is the longest route (4 hours). Route to both airports in Istanbul, is one of the busiest in Turkey, with 201 departures weekly, almost half of the total flights.

In February 2023, the airport was closed due to runway damage as a result of the 2023 Turkey–Syria earthquake.

Airlines and destinations
The following airlines operate regular scheduled and charter flights at Adana Şakirpaşa Airport:

Statistics

Passenger figures

Route statistics

Ground transportation
Local buses/minibuses, coaches, airline shuttles, trains and taxi serve ground transportation to or close to the airport.

Buses and coaches

Adana Metropolitan Municipality local buses #135 and #159, run from the airport to the neighbourhoods of Seyhan, Çukurova and Sarıçam. Bus #159 is a 35-minute interval service that connects airport to the old town, metro (Vilayet station), Central railway station, and routes further north, ending in Kurttepe, close to the lake. Bus #135 is an hourly service to Balcalı (Çukurova University).

Several local buses and minibuses that run east–west on the D400 state road, stop at the Airport intersection, 800 metres north of the airport terminals.

Coach transport to the provinces surrounding Cilicia, run from the Central Coach Terminal, 3.9 km west of the airport entrance. Coach companies' shuttle services from the city centre to the Central Coach Terminal have stops at the Airport Intersection on the D400 state road.

Rail
Şakirpaşa railway station is 1.9 kilometres' walking distance to the airport terminals, and it is located one block north of the D400 state road. There are frequent train services to Mersin Central, Tarsus and Adana Central stations, and fewer daily services to eastern stations of Adana; Yüreğir, İncirlik and Ceyhan. Also from the station, there are once daily trips to Osmaniye, İskenderun, İslahiye, Karaman and Niğde.

Accidents and incidents
1961 Turkish Airlines Ankara crash
1962 Turkish Airlines Taurus Mountains crash
7 April 1999 Turkish Airlines Flight 5904

References

External links

1937 establishments in Turkey
Airports established in 1937
Airports in Turkey
Buildings and structures in Adana
Transport in Adana
Buildings damaged by the 2023 Turkey–Syria earthquake